Jannie Lasimbang is a Malaysian politician who has served as Chairperson of the Rural Development Corporation (KPD) since February 2023 and Member of the Sabah State Legislative Assembly (MLA) for Kapayan since May 2018. She served as the State Assistant Minister of Law and Native Affairs of Sabah in the Heritage Party state administration under former Chief Minister Shafie Apdal from May 2018 to the collapse of the WARISAN state administration in September 2020. She is a member of the Democratic Action Party (DAP), a component party of the Pakatan Harapan (PH) coalition. She has served as the International Secretary of DAP since March 2022.

Election results

Honours
  :
  Companion of the Order of Kinabalu (ASDK) (2018)

References

Living people
Government ministers of Malaysia
Democratic Action Party (Malaysia) politicians
Members of the Sabah State Legislative Assembly
Women government ministers of Malaysia
Women MLAs in Sabah
1962 births